Michael P. Cahill (born December 12, 1961, in Beverly, Massachusetts) is an American politician who is the 34th and current mayor of Beverly, Massachusetts. He previously represented the 6th Essex district in the Massachusetts House of Representatives from 1993 to 2003. He was a candidate for Treasurer and Receiver-General of Massachusetts in 2002, finishing fourth in the Democratic primary.

After leaving the General Court, Cahill was elected to the Beverly City Council and served as Council President. He was a candidate for Mayor of Beverly in 2011, but lost to incumbent William F. Scanlon Jr. In 2013, Scanlon retired and Cahill ran again. He defeated city councilor Wes Slate by 5,752 votes to 4,563.

References

1963 births
Mayors of Beverly, Massachusetts
Democratic Party members of the Massachusetts House of Representatives
Middlebury College alumni
Suffolk University Law School alumni
Living people